Gaćinović (is a Serbian surname.

Notable people with the surname include:

 Vladimir Gaćinović (1890–1917), Bosnian Serb writer and revolutionary
 Vladimir Gaćinović (born 1966), Bosnian Serb footballer and coach
 his son Mijat Gaćinović (born 1995), Serbian professional footballer

Serbian surnames
Slavic-language surnames
Patronymic surnames